Heidi Becker may refer to:
Heidi Becker-Ramlow (1954–1987), diver for East Germany in the 1972 and 1976 Olympics
Heidi N. Becker, American planetary scientist and expert on Jupiter